In mathematics and optimization, a pseudo-Boolean function is a function of the form

A Boolean function is then a special case, where the values are also restricted to 0 or 1.

Representations
Any pseudo-Boolean function can be written uniquely as a multi-linear polynomial:

The degree of the pseudo-Boolean function is simply the degree of the polynomial in this representation.

Again in this case we can uniquely write   as a multi-linear polynomial:

Optimization
Minimizing (or, equivalently, maximizing) a pseudo-Boolean function is NP-hard. This can easily be seen by formulating, for example, the maximum cut problem as maximizing a pseudo-Boolean function.

Submodularity
The submodular set functions can be viewed as a special class of pseudo-Boolean functions, which is equivalent to the condition

This is an important class of pseudo-boolean functions, because they can be minimized in polynomial time. Note that minimization of a submodular function is a polynomially solvable problem  independent on the presentation form, for e.g. pesudo-Boolean polynomials, opposite to maximization of a submodular function which is NP-hard, Alexander Schrijver (2000).

Roof Duality
If f is a quadratic polynomial, a concept called roof duality can be used to obtain a lower bound for its minimum value. Roof duality may also provide a partial assignment of the variables, indicating some of the values of a minimizer to the polynomial. Several different methods of obtaining lower bounds were developed only to later be shown to be equivalent to what is now called roof duality.

Quadratizations
If the degree of f is greater than 2, one can always employ reductions to obtain an equivalent quadratic problem with additional variables. One possible reduction is

There are other possibilities, for example,

Different reductions lead to different results. Take for example the following cubic polynomial:

Using the first reduction followed by roof duality, we obtain a lower bound of -3 and no indication on how to assign the three variables. Using the second reduction, we obtain the (tight) lower bound of -2 and the optimal assignment of every variable (which is ).

Polynomial Compression Algorithms
Then  Assume that each coefficient  is integral. 

See also
Boolean function
Quadratic pseudo-Boolean optimization

Notes

References
 
 
 
 
 
 
 Alexander Schrijver. A Combinatorial Algorithm Minimizing Submodular Functions in Strongly Polynomial Time. Journal of Combinatorial Theory, Series B, Volume 80, Issue 2, November 2000, Pages 346-355.

Mathematical optimization